Port Dickson High School (Malay: Sekolah Menengah Kebangsaan Tinggi Port Dickson or SMK Tinggi Port Dickson) is a secondary school located in Port Dickson, Malaysia. The school is widely known as STPD.

History 
Education in Port Dickson began before 1910 in a private school. However, there was pressure to open an English school in the city. A group of local residents led by Postmaster Mr Kandiah, appealed to the government to take over the private school owned by Mrs. Edwards, wife of the police chief of Port Dickson. The school was transferred to the fire station's parking lot. A few months later, the school was moved to the site of the current JKR store.

In 1919, the school was moved on site Sekolah Rendah Kebangsaan Port Dickson today. In the initial years, the school only took female teachers. In 1924, the school broke that tradition by appointing Mr. S.P.S Kannu from Kuala Pilah as the Head Master. While Mr S.P.S Kannu was appointed, the number of students in this school was 80 and the school offered education up to standard 5. The number of students increased by 200 students from the year 1924 until the time of the Japanese war in Malaya. Students who had completed their studies up to standard 5, went to Seremban to continue their studies.

After the war ended, the school was reopened. The school was temporarily located in Sekolah Kebangsaan Kampung Gelam because the existing schools was being repaired because Sekolah Rendah Kebangsaan Port Dickson was used as the headquarters for the Japanese Shipbuilding during the war. Six months later, the school was moved to its own building, administered by Mr. Lionel Van Geyzel as the Head Master. The number of students increased to 656 due to the two new classroom blocks were built.

School identity

School badge 
 Books represent academic activities and continuing education.
 Javelin thrower: Sports activities are balanced with the importance of education.
 Lighthouse: The school is a light to the students.
 Blue and light blue colours symbolise the harmony of the school. The colours also reflect the position of the school in Port Dickson.

External links 

Schools in Negeri Sembilan
Secondary schools in Malaysia